Marrio Darnell Grier (December 5, 1971 – March 15, 2022) was an American professional football running back in the National Football League (NFL) who played two seasons for the New England Patriots. He played college football for the Clemson University before transferring to University of Tennessee at Chattanooga. He also played as a running back and linebacker in the Arena Football League (AFL) for the Carolina Cobras and Colorado Crush. Grier died on March 15, 2022, at the age of 50.

NFL career
Grier was drafted 195th in the 6th round of the NFL Draft. He was waived at the end of the 1997–1998 preseason.

References

1971 births
2022 deaths
American football running backs
New England Patriots players
Players of American football from Charlotte, North Carolina
Carolina Cobras players
Colorado Crush players
Clemson Tigers football players
Chattanooga Mocs football players